is a video game series of boxing created by Nintendo's general manager Genyo Takeda, and his partner Makoto Wada. The first game was Punch-Out!! made in 1984 as an arcade unit, which was followed by a sequel Super Punch-Out!! (1984). The series was released on home consoles soon after, starting with Mike Tyson's Punch-Out!! on the NES in 1987 and Super Punch-Out!! on the Super NES in 1994.

A reboot of the series entitled Punch-Out!!, was released in May 2009 on the Wii, along with a Club Nintendo exclusive WiiWare prequel Doc Louis's Punch-Out!! in October 2009. The series also had a spin-off called Arm Wrestling, which was released only in North American arcades, and was Nintendo's last arcade game they independently developed and released.

Gameplay
Playing as Little Mac, a 17-year old boxer from Bronx, New York  called The Bruiser from the Bronx, he must climb the ranks of the World Video Boxing Association (WVBA for short), and fight his way against other boxers from around the world, going from the Minor Circuit then the Major Circuit and then the World Circuit, while fighting challengers including Glass Joe, King Hippo, Piston Hondo, Don Flamenco, Bald Bull, Mr. Sandman, or in the original NES version, the former heavyweight boxing champion himself, Mike Tyson.  Gameplay differs slightly between each game, but generally, Mac can attack with his left and right fists, at the head or the body, and can also dodge and block to avoid the opponent's attacks. Many games in the series give the player a powerful uppercut ability; its use is limited, must be earned during matches, and has a star punch that can be obtained by hitting an opponent while taunting or at just the right time. Little Mac can also block, causing him to take minimal damage.

The key to defeating each opponent is to learn their fighting patterns, avoid their attacks and respond with a counterattack. Opponents will always give a visual or audible cue to signal their next attack, though as the game progresses, the time given to the player to successfully react significantly decreases. If the player successfully dodges an attack, the opponent will be left vulnerable for a while, allowing the player to strike back. Little Mac can block some of his opponent's punches by holding up his gloves, but he will eventually tire out if he blocks too much.

Characters

List of games

Other appearances in media
The series has made multiple appearances in other games as well. The Super NES version of Super Punch-Out!! was included in the Nintendo GameCube version of Electronic Arts' Fight Night Round 2. The protagonist of the Super NES version of Super Punch-Out!! appears as a secret boxer in full 3D with the name "MAC" on his boxers and was referred to as "Little Mac" as part of the Nintendo-exclusives deal between Nintendo and EA in allowing several Nintendo characters to star in EA sports games. Due to the third-party nature of his role in the game, it is considered by several fans of the series, to be uncanon. Little Mac further made a cameo appearance in skip Ltd.'s Wii video game Captain Rainbow, where the title character has to help train Little Mac to get in shape to regain his championship title. Little Mac also appears as an assist trophy in Super Smash Bros. Brawl before becoming a playable character in Super Smash Bros. for Nintendo 3DS and Wii U and Super Smash Bros. Ultimate.

Notes

References

External links
Punch-Out!! Wii Game Website.
Developer interviews about Punch-Out!! franchise history

 
Nintendo franchises
Video game franchises introduced in 1984